Olympias is a reconstruction of an ancient Athenian trireme and an important example of experimental archaeology. It is also a commissioned ship in the Hellenic Navy of Greece, the only commissioned vessel of its kind in any of the world's navies.

History 
Olympias was constructed from 1985 to 1987 by a shipbuilder in Piraeus. She was built to drawings by the naval architect John F. Coates which he developed through long discussions with the historian J. S. Morrison following the longest correspondence on any subject in The Times in the early 1980s.  The work was also advised by the classics teacher Charles Willink and drew on evidence gained from Greek literature, history of art and archaeology above and below water. Finance came from the Hellenic Navy and donors such as Frank Welsh (a banker, writer and trireme enthusiast). Morrison, Coates and Willink founded the Trireme Trust together with Welsh. The Trireme Trust is now chaired by professor Boris Rankov.

The bronze bow ram weighs 200 kg. It is a copy of an original ram now in the Piraeus archaeological museum. The ship was built from Douglas fir and Virginia oak. The keel is of iroko hardwood.

The important hypozomata (bracing ropes) had to be replaced by a steel rope because no natural fibre or synthetic fibre ropes with about the same elastic modulus as hemp could be obtained for economic reasons. The steel cables' tension varied as the hull bent on the waves, rather than exerting constant tension like a natural fibre rope. This caused the alarming possibility of the rope breaking and endangering the crew, so protective measures had to be taken.

She underwent sea trials in 1987, 1990, 1992 and 1994, but one of the most informative was a 1987 exercise crewed by 170 volunteer oarsmen and oarswomen. These results, achieved with an inexperienced, mixed crew, suggest that ancient historians like Thucydides were not exaggerating about the capabilities of triremes.

Olympias was transported to Britain in 1993, to take part in events celebrating the 2,500 years since the beginning of democracy. In 2004 she was used to transport the Olympic Flame ceremonially from the port of Keratsini to the main port of Piraeus, as the Olympic Torch Relay approached Athens for the 2004 Summer Olympics.

Olympias is now an exhibit in a dry dock at the Naval Tradition Park in Palaio Faliro, Athens, Greece.

In the  years 2016 to 2018, a number of trips in the Saronic Gulf were organized, with amateur rowers and passengers.

Technology 

The trireme was a fast attack, light displacement vessel. In order to sustain the bending moments of her considerable length, a tightened rope (hypozomata) was mounted beneath the deck spanning from bow to stern. This was an ingenious way to increase rigidity of the hull. Today in modern construction it is called pre-tensioning. After every trip the triremes were pulled ashore in special slides and the hypozomata was re-tightened.

The trireme hulls were constructed from planks with closely spaced and pegged mortise and tenon joints. When these are fitted carefully the hull can carry shear stresses well and stay watertight.

Crew 
A trireme of the classical period would have had a crew of 200, including five officers. This would be made up of:

trierarchos ( " ") — the commanding officer, responsible for supporting the ship
kybernetes (:  "steer") — executive officer, responsible for the cruising safety
keleustes (:  "command") — responsible for the training and morale of the crew
pentekontarchos ( " ") — administration officer
prorates (:  "prow") — bow officer, responsible for keeping a sharp lookout
 1 auletes (:  "flute") — a musician supplying the oar timing with his flute
170 eretai (oarsmen) in three banks
62 thranitai (singular :  "bench") — the upper bank
54 zygitai (singular :  "yoke", "rowing-bench") — the middle bank
54 thalamitai (singular :  "inner chamber") — lower bank
 10 sailors for handling the sails
 14 epibatai (marines, literally "passengers") - 10 spearmen and 4 archers

See also
 Havhingsten fra Glendalough, a modern reconstruction of a Viking longship.

References

External links

Relevant Page from Hellenic Navy
Ships of the World: An Historical Encyclopedia
The Trireme Trust

Trireme Olympias underway (YouTube)

Ships of the Hellenic Navy
Ships built in Greece
1987 ships
Replica ships
Museum ships in Greece